The 2011 Delta State gubernatorial election was the 5th gubernatorial election of Delta State. Held on April 26, 2011, the People's Democratic Party nominee Emmanuel Uduaghan won the election, defeating Great Ogboru of the Democratic People's Party.

Results 
A total of 23 candidates contested in the election. Emmanuel Uduaghan from the People's Democratic Party won the election, defeating Great Ogboru from the Democratic People's Party. Valid votes was 1,017,234, votes cast was 1,051,229, 33,995 votes was cancelled.

References 

Delta State gubernatorial elections
Delta gubernatorial
April 2011 events in Nigeria